Simpsonichthys espinhacensis is a species of killifish from the family Rivulidae. It is found in the upper Jequitinhonha River basin in Minas Gerais, eastern Brazil. The specific name refers to the Espinhaço Mountains where the known range of this species lies.

Description

Habitat
The species is known from wetlands at elevations of  [[above sea level These wetlands are flooded during the rainy season and reduced to small pools and intermittent channels during the dry season. Vegetation is characterized by herbaceous and grassy plants as well as 
Mauritia flexuosa palms.

References

espinhacensis 
Fish of the Jequitinhonha River basin
Endemic fauna of Brazil
Taxa named by Dalton Tavares Bressane Nielsen
Taxa named by Tiago C. Pessali
Taxa named by Guilherme Moreira Dutra
Fish described in 2017